Highway 909 is a provincial highway in the far north region of the Canadian province of Saskatchewan. It runs from Highway 155, beginning 7.5 km south of the hamlet of Bear Creek, to the settlement of Turnor Lake.

This access road to Turnor Lake was built when Highway 155 was built to La Loche during the 1960s.

Highway 909 was rebuilt beginning in 1997, and this update was completed in September 2001. It is entirely unpaved.

Along Highway 909 are local trails to lakes along the route. The Palmbere Lake access trail is 6 km from the turn-off and the  McAnesley Lake access trail is 22 km from the turn-off.

At the end of Highway 909 in the village of Turnor Lake a 12 km road leads south-east to the northern shore of Frobisher Lake.

Major intersections

See also 
Roads in Saskatchewan
Transportation in Saskatchewan

References 

909